Rodeo Ruby Love was a pop/rock band that formed in Marion, Indiana. They were signed to Pentimento Music Company, an independent record label. The band gained prominence in 2011, when they toured with Streetlight Manifesto and Reel Big Fish. Rodeo Ruby released its first album, Your Love Has Made Everything Beautiful, in 2006. They have since released two EP's, three more studio albums, and a live album.

History

Formation and early years
Rodeo Ruby Love was founded in 2005 by lead singer Zack Melton. Their music is inspired by the church hyms and pop-country radio of Zack Melton's childhood, and the energy of the scene in central Indiana. The band's name Rodeo Ruby Love was inspired by the name of Zack Melton's grandmother, Ruby, and his second favorite Garth Brooks song, "Rodeo". Rodeo Ruby Love recorded its first album, Your Love Has Made Everything Beautiful (2006), in a basement in Bloomington Indiana. They followed the album by simultaneously releasing two EP's, What Loneliness Can Do To You and Honest To God (2007), and touring through the midwest and southeast. Their second album, Vs. The Great American Cities (2008), was released under Crossroads of America Records.  The band disbanded in 2015.

Rise to prominence
The band's popularity started to spread beyond the midwest in 2010. The band released their third album, This Is Why We Don't Have Nice Things (2010), under Crossroads of America Records, and went on their first self-booked national tour. The band signed onto the label Pentimento Music Company, and kicked off the switch with a re-release of This Is Why We Don't Have Nice Things and by going on a national tour with two prominent ska bands, Streetlight Manifesto, and Reel Big Fish, performing to sold out crowds at nationally recognized venues.

Fourth album
Rodeo Ruby Love released its fourth album, The Pits, on June 11, 2013, and went on a month-long national tour with Streetlight Manifesto and Empty Orchestra. The album was engineered and mixed by Wes DeBoy and mastered by Carl Saff.

News Coverage
Rodeo Ruby Love has been reviewed and interviewed on several websites. The Pits has been reviewed on Earth to the Ground Music, Obscure Sound, and received a 5 star review in NUVO, an Indianapolis Newspaper. Zach Melton has been interviewed on Live High Five, and Mind Equals Blown.  This Is Why We Don't Have Nice Things has been reviewed on Punknews.org.

Members
Current members

Zack Melton - lead vocals, guitar 
Annie Cheek - vocals 
Kurt Friedrich - keyboard 
Dillon Enright - drums 
Ben Claghorn - bass 
Steve Marino - guitar  

Former members

Kyle Kammeyer - guitar 
Stephen Boyd - drums 

 Alexander Case - bass

Discography
Albums
 Your Love Has Made Everything Beautiful (2006)
 Vs. the Great American Cities (2008)
 This is Why We Don't Have Nice Things (2011) 
 The Pits (2013)
EPs
 What Loneliness Can Do To You (2007)
 Honest To God (2007)

Discography details

This Is Why We Don't Have Nice ThingsThis Is Why We Don't Have Nice Things is the third album, released June 29, 2010 on Crossroads of America Records. It was re-released on September 27, 2011 by Pentimento Music Company. The album was engineered by Wes DeBoy, mixed by Ed Rose and mastered by Mike Fossenkemper.  The album received generally positive reviews. Indie Vision Music called it a "fun, thoughtful, and all-around brilliant record."'This Is Why We Don't Have Nice Things track listing'''

References

External links
Official band website

Rock music groups from Indiana